Aleksander Kask (29 November 1885 – 24 January 1950) was an Estonian politician. He was a member of Estonian National Assembly.

He was born in Lohusuu Municipality, Tartu County.

References

1885 births
1950 deaths
20th-century Estonian politicians
Members of the Estonian National Assembly
Members of the Riiginõukogu
People from Mustvee Parish